Señorita Panamá 1991, the ninth Señorita Panamá pageant, was held in Teatro Anayansi Centro de Convenciones Atlapa, Panama city, Panama, in September 1991, after weeks of events. The winner of the pageant was Ana Orillac.

The pageant was broadcast live on RPC Panamá and produced with the collaboration of Venevision. About 13 contestants from all over Panamá competed for the prestigious crown. At the conclusion of the final night of competition, outgoing titleholder Liz Michelle De León Paz crowned Ana Cecilia Orillac Arias as the new Señorita Panamá.

Orillac competed in the 41st edition of the Miss Universe 1992 pageant, held at Queen Sirikit National Convention Center, Bangkok, Thailand  on May 8, 1992.

Final result

Special awards

Contestants 
These are the competitors who have been selected this year.

Election schedule

Thursday September 1991 Final night, coronation Señorita Panamá 1991

Candidates notes

Janell Cosca Tovío †

References

External links
Señorita Panamá official website
Miss Panamá

Señorita Panamá
1991 beauty pageants